Love, Life & Loyalty is the first and only album by American hip hop musician GLC, released on October 12, 2010, on Ylimit Records. The album was mostly produced by Kanye West, but he received other production collaborations, like the producer and singer T-Pain, among The Legendary Traxster and the rest of Kanye's GOOD Music producers.

Background
The album features production by Arlo Jackson, Sean Breeze, Dae Dae, Ferrari Mike, Leonard Harris, GLC, Keezo Kane, The Legendary Traxster, T-Pain, Christian Rich, Arron Starr, Albert Sye, Kanye West, Xcel, this influenced in the album style and lyricism, who assumed alternative hip hop characteristics, added at the midwest rap style, who  created a new fusion in GLC's career. In the lyricism predominated the old southern lyrical styles, over the GLC compositions and Kanye's production, and the lyricism was compared to Kanye's debut and second albums.
The album was announced by GLC at the beginning of the year, and was promoted with the single "Flight School". GLC also promoted his work in Kid Cudi's second album, in the track "The End", along Nicole Wray, Cudi and Chip tha Ripper. GLC helped Kanye's fifth album in the background vocals. GOOD Music officially announced the album in September.

Charts and critical response
The album reached No. 90 on the Billboard Top R&B/Hip-Hop Albums chart. Critic response was mostly positive in the alternative hip hop and UK scene. The best received tracks were "Flight School" and "Clockin' Lotsa Dollarz".

Singles
The album's single "Flight School", featured production and vocals from his mentor, Kanye West, as well as T-Pain. The song does not have an official music video, but was well received by most Magazines and Critics alike. The first official single of the album is "Clockin' Lotsa Dollarz", featuring the south star, member of UGK, Bun B, along with the rapper Sir Mix-A-Lot, featuring production from Kanye West and The Legendary Traxster. The single had an official music video, and was performed live at the A3C festival, in Perfect Attendance Stage, in a surprise performance; also at the BB King, in NYC. The single, on iTunes, comes with a clean and an explicit version.

Track listing

Personnel
Confirmed by Allmusic.

 Victor Alexander - Composer
 Kori Anders - Engineer
 Craig Bauer - Engineer, Mixing
 Eric Bearden - Composer
 Jeremy Bolden - Composer
 Terrence Boykin	- Composer
 Sean Breeze - Producer
 Bryant Bell - Composer
 Arron Butts - Composer
 Mel Carter - Executive Producer
 Tator Chip - Vocals
 Eugene Cohill - A&R, Engineer
 Dae Dae - Producer
 Damien Davis - Composer
 Janelle Dudley - Vocals
 Ferrari Mike - Executive Producer
 Andre Frazier - Composer
 Bernard Freeman - Composer
 GLC - Arranger, Design, Photography, Producer
 Leonard Harris - Design, Engineer, Executive Producer, Photography
 Leonard Lavelle Harris - Composer
 Kende Hassan - Composer
 Taiwo Hassan - Composer, Engineer

 Matt Hennessy - Engineer, Mixing
 Leray "Arlo" Jackson - Composer
 Keezo Kane - Producer
 Shaun Kerr - Composer
 Anthony Kilhoffer - Engineer
 Michael Kolar - Engineer, Mastering, Mixing
 Jeff Lane - Engineer
 Laurie Latham - Engineer
 The Legendary Traxster - Mixing, Producer
 Samuel Lindley - Composer
 Man Man - Keyboards
 Carl Mitchell - Composer
 Faheem Rasheed Najm - Composer, Producer
 Anthony Ray - Composer, Engineer
 Christian Rich - Producer
 Brian Sledge - Composer
 Bruce Springsteen - Composer
 Jon Spurgeon - Engineer
 Arron Starr - Producer
 Albert Sye - Executive Producer
 Kanye West - Composer, Producer
 Xcel - Producer
 Zzaje - Horn

References

2010 albums
Albums produced by Kanye West